Lucas Gomes Arcanjo (April 30, 1971 – March 26, 2016) was a police officer who served as civil police for the State Traffic Department of Minas Gerais and was also a candidate for a seat in the Chamber of Deputies for the Brazilian Labour Renewal Party. Arcanjo was famously known in  online social networks by several accusations against the Senator, Aécio Neves (PSDB). In many different YouTube videos, the police officer accused the politician of involvement with various crimes, such as drug trafficking, purchase of habeas corpus and murder. In one of the video recordings, he said that a body was found in Neves' cousin's property in Cláudio municipality with indications of a Coup de grâce execution. Arcanjo gained support from well-known actress Tássia Camargo, who reinforced the accusations of police officer against the Senator. The officer was the victim of four death attempts as an answer to the complaints made. On March 26, 2016, he was found dead in his home with a tie at the neck tied in his bedroom window. Family members rule out the possibility of suicide.

References 

1971 births
2016 deaths
People from Belo Horizonte
Brazilian police officers
People murdered in Brazil